The Corpus Christi Open was a golf tournament played at Corpus Christi Country Club in Corpus Christi, Texas from February 2 to 4, 1945. Prize money was $5,000. The course measured under 6,000 yards. Byron Nelson scored 66-63-65-70 for a total of 264 and won by four strokes from Jug McSpaden.

Winners

References

Former PGA Tour events
Golf in Texas